"Favor" is a song by American producers Vindata and Skrillex, and American-Haitian vocalist NSTASIA. It was released on August 8, 2017, via Owsla.

Production 
Described as progressive melodic dance-pop, the song is composed of warm chords and a 'flute-driven' drop. The official audio was released on Owsla's YouTube channel on August 7, 2017. NSTASIA's multi-layered vocal harmonies are credited as why "the production sounds grand and immersive".

References 

Skrillex songs
Future bass songs
2017 songs
2017 singles
Owsla singles
Songs written by Poo Bear
Songs written by Skrillex